Single jeopardy or variation, may refer to:

 the legal view that accused should not face double jeopardy, facing jeopardy twice, but only once, or singly, a single jeopardy; see Double jeopardy
 in jurisprudence, the first time that jeopardy is attached to a criminal proceeding; see Prejudice (legal term)
 the first instance of oppression in the triple oppression theory about discrimination and oppression
 Single Jeopardy!, a misnomer for the first round of the Jeopardy! TV quiz gameshow

See also

 A single named Jeopardy
 "Jeopardy" (single), a 1983 single by the Greg Kihn Band off the album Kihnspiracy
 Single (disambiguation)
 Jeopardy (disambiguation)